Abdeslam Akouzar (born 15 April 1982 in Agadir, Morocco) is a Moroccan football midfielder.

He signed for Troyes from FC Gueugnon on 20 July 2009.

References

External links

1982 births
Living people
People from Agadir
Moroccan expatriate footballers
Moroccan footballers
Association football midfielders
Expatriate footballers in France
AS Beauvais Oise players
Stade de Reims players
FC Gueugnon players
ES Troyes AC players
US Orléans players
Ligue 2 players
Wasquehal Football players